Frederik Van Lierde (born 25 May 1979) is a Belgian professional triathlete and 2013 Ironman triathlon world champion.

Van Lierde has been coached for two years by two-time Ironman champion and former world record holder Luc Van Lierde, to whom he is not related. He came in third in the 2012 Ironman World Championship. On 13 October 2013, Van Lierde won the same championship, becoming only the second Belgian to win the Ironman, after Luc Van Lierde. He finished the race with a 51:02 swim, a 4:25:37 bike and a 2:51:18 marathon to capture the win in total of 8:12:29. It was the eighth-fastest time in the 35-year history of the event.

In March 2017, Van Lierde was attacked and robbed while training in Port Elizabeth, South Africa.

Notable results
2007 European championship LD ITU - 1st
2008 Ironman New Zealand - 2nd
2010 Ironman France - 2nd
2011 Ironman 70.3 South Africa - 1st
2011 Abu Dhabi triathlon - 1st
2011 Ironman France - 1st
2012 Ironman Melbourne - 3rd
2012 Ironman France - 1st
2012 Ironman World Championship - 3rd
2013 Abu Dhabi triathlon - 1st
2013 Ironman France - 1st
2013 Ironman World Championship - 1st
2014 Ironman Germany - 2nd
2015 Ironman South Africa - 1st
2016 Ironman Mexico - 1st
2017 Ironman France - 1st
2018 Ironman France - 1st
2019 Ironman France  - 3rd

References

External links 
 

1979 births
Belgian male triathletes
Ironman world champions
Living people
People from Menen
Sportspeople from West Flanders